= Hiring =

Hiring may refer to:

- Recruitment of personnel (usually called hiring in American English)
- Renting of something (borrowing for a fee, usually called hiring in British English)
